This is the list of episodes for The Late Late Show with James Corden in 2020.

2020

January

February

March

April

May

June

August

September

October

November

December

References

External links 
 

 
Lists of variety television series episodes
2020-related lists